The Presbyterian Church in Korea (YunShin) is a theologically Reformed and Presbyterian denomination in South Korea. It subscribes the Apostles Creed and Westminster Confession. In 2004 it had 6,469 members in 88 congregations served by 84 pastors.

References 

Presbyterian denominations in South Korea
Presbyterian denominations in Asia